4′-Demethylrebeccamycin synthase (EC 4.3.3.5, arcyriaflavin A N-glycosyltransferase, RebG) is an enzyme with systematic name 4′-demethylrebeccamycin D-glucose-lyase. It catalyses the following chemical reaction

 4′-O-demethylrebeccamycin + H2O  dichloro-arcyriaflavin A + β-D-glucose

This enzyme catalyses a step in the biosynthesis of rebeccamycin.

References

External links 
 

EC 4.3.3